Ścinawa may refer to:
Ścinawa, a town in Lower Silesian Voivodeship, in south-western Poland
Ścinawa, Oława County, a village in Oława County, Lower Silesian Voivodeship, in south-western Poland
 Ścinawa Mała, a village in the administrative district of Gmina Korfantów, within Nysa County, Opole Voivodeship, in south-western Poland
 Ścinawa Nyska, a village in the administrative district of Gmina Korfantów, within Nysa County, Opole Voivodeship, in south-western Poland
 Ścinawa Polska,  a village in the administrative district of Gmina Oława, within Oława County, Lower Silesian Voivodeship, in south-western Poland
 Scinawa Commune, an urban-rural gmina (administrative district) in Lubin County, Lower Silesian Voivodeship, in south-western Poland

See also